James Herriot (born 20 December 1939) is a Scottish former footballer who played as a goalkeeper for clubs in Scotland, England and South Africa. Herriot represented both Scotland and the Scottish League XI.

Career
Herriot was an apprentice bricklayer playing part-time for Junior club Douglasdale before he joined Dunfermline Athletic in 1958. He became the Pars established number 1 when Eddie Connachan left for Middlesbrough in 1963. Herriot adopted the American Football technique of applying boot polish under and around his eyes to reduce the effects of glare from the sun. Herriot helped Dunfermline reach the 1965 Scottish Cup Final, which they lost 3–2 to Celtic.

Herriot was transferred to Birmingham City for £18,000 in 1965. He was a fixture in the City side during the next four-and-a-half years and eventually gained international recognition. He made his Scotland debut in October 1968, in a 1–0 defeat by Denmark in a friendly in Copenhagen, and played a further seven times for the national side. His last cap came just a year after his first, in a 3–2 defeat by West Germany in a FIFA World Cup qualifier in Hamburg.

By 1970 Herriot had fallen from favour at St Andrew's and, following loan spells with Mansfield Town and Aston Villa, he left for South African club Durban City. He returned to Britain in 1971, joining Eddie Turnbull's developing Hibernian side. With Hibs he won his first career honour, the 1972–73 Scottish League Cup, as well as the fledgling Drybrough Cup on two occasions.

He left the Edinburgh side to join St Mirren in 1973, then moved to Partick Thistle in 1975. After a spell on loan with Morton in October 1975 he returned to Dunfermline Athletic in early 1976 before joining Morton permanently for the 1976–77 season. He retired from the game in the summer of 1977.

Literary alter ego
Herriot is probably best known today for giving his name to the writer James Herriot, a Yorkshire vet whose real name was Alf Wight. Wight needed a pen-name to comply with professional rules banning advertising and chose Jim Herriot's name after seeing him play for Birmingham City in a televised match against Manchester United.

References

External links
 
 

1939 births
Living people
Footballers from North Lanarkshire
Scottish footballers
Scotland international footballers
Association football goalkeepers
Dunfermline Athletic F.C. players
Birmingham City F.C. players
Mansfield Town F.C. players
Aston Villa F.C. players
Durban City F.C. players
Hibernian F.C. players
St Mirren F.C. players
Partick Thistle F.C. players
Greenock Morton F.C. players
Scottish Football League players
English Football League players
Scottish Football League representative players
Scottish expatriate footballers
Scottish expatriate sportspeople in South Africa
Expatriate soccer players in South Africa